Kirkpatrick is an Irish (Ulster) and Scottish surname, and occasionally a given name, possibly a branch of the Cenél nEógain of the Northern Uí Néill. The name traditionally relates to a church ("kirk") dedicated to Saint Patrick.

Surname 
 Alexander Kirkpatrick (1849-1940), British professor of Hebrew and biblical commentator 

 Alexander Kirkpatrick (rugby union) (1898-1971), New Zealand rugby union player
 Andrew Kirkpatrick (lawyer) (1756–1831), Chief Justice of New Jersey Supreme Court
 Andrew Kirkpatrick (judge) (1844–1904), U.S. District Court for New Jersey, grandson of Andrew Kirkpatrick (1756–1831) (above)
 Andrew Kirkpatrick (politician) (1848–1928), South Australian politician
 Andy Kirkpatrick (born 1971), British climber and writer
 Ann Kirkpatrick (born 1950), American politician—Arizona
 Barbro Owens-Kirkpatrick (born 1946), American diplomat
 Bob Kirkpatrick (musician) (born 1934), American Texas blues guitarist, singer and songwriter
 Chris Kirkpatrick (born 1971), American musician
 Clayton Kirkpatrick (1915–2004), American journalist and newspaper editor
 Conilee Kirkpatrick (born 1948), American electronics engineer
 Cyril Kirkpatrick (1872–1957), British civil engineer
 David Kirkpatrick (producer) (born 1951), American film producer
 David Gordon Kirkpatrick (1927–2003), Australian country musician known as Slim Dusty
 David G. Kirkpatrick, Canadian computer scientist
 Donald Kirkpatrick (1924–2014, fl. 1960s), American educator
 Ethel Kirkpatrick (1869–1966), British artist and jeweller
 Frederick Douglass Kirkpatrick (1933–1986), African-American musician, civil rights activist, and minister
 Gary Kirkpatrick (1941–2021), American concert pianist
 George Airey Kirkpatrick (1841–1899), Canadian politician
 George G. Kirkpatrick Jr. (1938–2003), American politician
 Harry Kirkpatrick (born c. 1958), Irish activist and convict
 Ian Kirkpatrick (born 1946), New Zealand rugby union player
 Ivone Kirkpatrick (1897–1964), British diplomat
 J. Davy Kirkpatrick, American astronomer
 James Kirkpatrick (disambiguation), various people
 Jeane Kirkpatrick (1926–2006), American diplomat for whom the American political doctrine, Kirkpatrick Doctrine, is named
 Joey Kirkpatrick (born 1952), American glass artist, sculptor, wire artist, and educator
 John Kirkpatrick (rugby league) (born 1979), British player
 John Kirkpatrick (musician) (born 1947), English musician
 John Simpson Kirkpatrick (1892–1915), British-born Australian soldier
 Joseph Kirkpatrick (1872-1930), British artist
 Karey Kirkpatrick (born 1964), American writer
 Kitty Kirkpatrick (1802–1889), Anglo-Indian noblewoman, muse of the philosopher Thomas Carlyle
 Littleton Kirkpatrick (1797–1859), 19th-century American attorney, political figure
 Lyman Kirkpatrick (1916–1995), American government administrator
 Maggie Kirkpatrick (born 1941), Australian actress
 María Manuela Kirkpatrick (1794–1879), Spanish royal family member
 Nora Kirkpatrick (born 1984), American actress and musician, founding member of Edward Sharpe and the Magnetic Zeros
 Ralph Kirkpatrick (1911–1984), American musician, musicologist and cataloguer of the works of Domenico Scarlatti
 Randolph Kirkpatrick (1863–1950), British naturalist and author
 Roger de Kirkpatrick (fl. 14th century), Scottish activist
 Samuel A. Kirkpatrick, president of the University of Texas at San Antonio and Eastern Michigan University
 Sanford Kirkpatrick (1842–1932), American politician—Iowa
 Sidney D. Kirkpatrick (born 1955), American documentary filmmaker and author
 Snyder S. Kirkpatrick (1848–1909), American politician—Kansas
 Sophia Astley Kirkpatrick (1802–1871), wife of Littleton Kirkpatrick (above), donor to Rutgers College
 Ted Kirkpatrick (1960–2022), American musician
 Timothy Kirkpatrick (born 1978), American drummer
 Thomas Kirkpatrick (Canadian politician) (1805–1870), Canadian politician
 Thomas Kirkpatrick (New York), New York politician
 Thomas J. Kirkpatrick (1829–1897), American lawyer and politician
 Wayne Kirkpatrick (born c. 1960), American musician
 William Kirkpatrick (disambiguation), various people

Given name 
Kirkpatrick Macmillan (1812–1878), Scottish blacksmith and inventor of the mechanical bicycle
Kirkpatrick Sale, American author, technology critic and tax resister

See also 
 Kirkpatrick baronets
 Clan Kirkpatrick, a Scottish clan
 Kirkpatrick & Lockhart, an American law firm
 Oysters Kirkpatrick (also called Oysters Kilpatrick), an English recipe involving oysters, cheese, and bacon

See also 
 Kilpatrick (disambiguation)

References